North Sheen is an area of London, England in the former Municipal Borough of Richmond (Surrey). It was incorporated into Kew in 1965 when the London Borough of Richmond upon Thames was created.

Although North Sheen no longer officially exists as a place name, it survives as the name of a station. Being south of the A316 road, the station is in Richmond rather than Kew, and so was not actually in North Sheen. Kew also has North Sheen Bowling Club, North Sheen Cemetery and North Sheen Recreation Ground.

History

North Sheen, whose etymology is shared with East Sheen, formed a civil parish from 1894 to 1965. Historically, it formed part of the Mortlake parish and became part of the expanded Municipal Borough of Richmond in 1892. Under the Local Government Act 1894, a new North Sheen parish was created from part of Mortlake, with the remainder of Mortlake then forming part of Barnes Urban District. In 1901 the population was 2,807 and in 1951 it was 7,429.

North Sheen was first marked on maps from 1904. At that time it was mostly undeveloped, but by 1920 residential building was underway.

In fiction

A major section of H. G. Wells' The War of the Worlds takes place at Sheen, depicting with considerable detail the destruction caused there by Wells' Martian invaders.

See also
The Barn Church, Kew
North Sheen Cemetery
North Sheen railway station
North Sheen Recreation Ground

Notes

References

External links
Historical data: Housing in North Sheen
Historical data: Population in North Sheen
Historical boundary maps for North Sheen

1894 establishments in England
1965 disestablishments in England
Areas of London
Districts of the London Borough of Richmond upon Thames
History of the London Borough of Richmond upon Thames
Kew, London